Abdelilah Basbousi is a Moroccan actor. He is best known for his role in Nabil Ayouch's 2021 film Casablanca Beats, which was selected to compete for the Palme d'Or at the 2021 Cannes Film Festival.

External links

References 

Moroccan male film actors
21st-century Moroccan male actors
Date of birth missing (living people)
Living people
Year of birth missing (living people)